A leaflet (occasionally called foliole) in botany is a leaf-like part of a compound leaf. Though it resembles an entire leaf, a leaflet is not borne on a main plant stem or branch, as a leaf is, but rather on a petiole or a branch of the leaf. Compound leaves are common in many plant families and they differ widely in morphology. The two main classes of compound leaf morphology are palmate and pinnate.
For example, a hemp plant has palmate compound leaves, whereas some species of Acacia have pinnate leaves.

The ultimate free division (or leaflet) of a compound leaf, or a pinnate subdivision of a multipinnate leaf is called a pinnule or pinnula.

See also 

 Compound leaf

References 

Plant morphology